Joseph of Panephysis or Joseph the Anchorite was an Egyptian Christian monk who lived around the 4th and 5th centuries in the desert of Lower Egypt. He was one of the Desert Fathers and was a contemporary for Abbas Poemen and Lot, who sometimes consulted him.

Joseph was born in Thmuis, Egypt and lived as an anchorite in Panephysis in eastern Egypt. There, he was visited by John Cassian, who mentioned him in the Conferences.

He is venerated as a saint in the Coptic Orthodox tradition. His feast day is June 17.

References

4th-century births
5th-century deaths
Egyptian Christian monks
Saints from Roman Egypt
Eastern Catholic saints
Coptic Orthodox saints
Desert Fathers